The Liquid Carbonic Company Building is a historic building Kansas City, Missouri. Built in 1913, it was listed on the National Register of Historic Places in 1994. The Liquid Carbonic Company was a manufacturer of soda fountains.

References

Office buildings completed in 1913
Buildings and structures in Kansas City, Missouri
Commercial buildings on the National Register of Historic Places in Missouri
1913 establishments in Missouri
National Register of Historic Places in Kansas City, Missouri